Ianthe (minor planet designation: 98 Ianthe) is a large main-belt asteroid, named for three figures in Greek mythology.  It is very dark and is composed of carbonates. It was one of the numerous (for his time—the 19th century) discoveries by C. H. F. Peters, who found it on April 18, 1868, from Clinton, New York.

This body is orbiting the Sun with a period of 4.41 years and an eccentricity of 0.186. The orbital plane is inclined at an angle of 15.6° to the plane of the ecliptic. Measurements of the cross-section dimension yield a size of around 105 km. Photometric observations of this asteroid during 2007 at the Organ Mesa Observatory in Las Cruces, New Mexico were used to create a light curve plot. This showed a synodic rotation period of  hours and a brightness variation of  magnitude during each cycle. It is classified as a C-type asteroid, indicating a dark, carbonaceous surface.

The detection of a candidate moon orbiting 98 Ianthe was announced in 2004.

References

External links
 
 

Background asteroids8
Ianthe
Ianthe
CG-type asteroids (Tholen)
Ch-type asteroids (SMASS)
18680418